My Own Swordsman is a 2011 Chinese period action comedy film directed by Shang Jing and a sequel to the 2006 series of the same name. The film was released on January 26, 2011.

This film criticizes the "wuxia culture" that promotes violence, and imitates, satirizes and criticizes the social phenomena of the time.

Cast
Yan Ni
Yao Chen
Yi Sha
Entai Yu
Hongjie Ni
Chao Jiang
Jian Xiao
Yueli Yue
Lei Wang
Wu Ma
Zhang Meng

Reception

Box office 
The film earned  at the Chinese box office.

References

External links

Chinese action comedy films
China Film Group Corporation films
2011 action comedy films
2011 films
2011 comedy films